Richard T. Heffron (October 6, 1930 – August 27, 2007) was an American film director.

He worked on many television series such as The Rockford Files and films including I Will Fight No More Forever (1975), Futureworld (1976), Foolin' Around (1980), the 1982 Mike Hammer film I, the Jury, Pancho Barnes (1988), and La révolution française (1989). He also directed the six-episode miniseries North and South but did not return to direct its follow-up series in 1986 and 1994.

References

External links

American film directors
American television directors
1930 births
2007 deaths